Thunder is a 1982 Japanese experimental short film directed by Takashi Ito. Shot on 16 mm film, Thunder makes use of long-exposure photography. Along with Ito's films Ghost (1984) and Grim (1985), Thunder has been noted for its ghostly imagery and ominous tone.

Thunder screened as part of the 34th Berlin International Film Festival in 1984, and was later shown at the Ishikawa Prefectural Museum of Art in 1996.

Synopsis
Thunder features a series of photographic slides of a woman repeatedly covering and uncovering her face with her hands, projected onto the interiors of an empty office building. The images bend and distort against the interior surfaces. Additionally, a long ribbon of light is seen curling and oscillating. The effect of the ribbon of light was produced using long-exposure photography, created frame-by-frame by a person with a flashlight moving throughout the building's rooms during long single-frame exposures.

Home media
Thunder was released on DVD along with a number of Ito's other works as part of the Takashi Ito Film Anthology.

References

External links
 

1982 films
1982 short films
1980s Japanese films
1980s avant-garde and experimental films
Japanese avant-garde and experimental films
Japanese short films
Films shot in 16 mm film